LLF may refer to:

 IATA code for Yongzhou Lingling Airport
 Landmark Legal Foundation
 Limited Locking Facility
 Line Loss Factor
 Lahore Literary Festival, an international literature festival held annually in Lahore, Pakistan
 Lucknow Literary Festival, an international literature festival held annually in Lucknow, Uttar Pradesh, India
 Llanfairfechan railway station, Wales; National Rail station code LLF.
 Load-loss factor
 Lobster Liberation Front
 Low-level formatting of computer hard disks.
 Low Level Flight, a Canadian alternative rock band
 LoveLikeFire, a San Francisco indie rock band